Ivan Ivanović may refer to:

 Ivan Rikard Ivanović (1880–1949), Croatian politician
Ivan Ivanović (born 1936), Serbian writer,
 Ivan Ivanović (born 1975), Serbian television host
 Ivan Ivanović (born 1981), Serbian rapper known by his stage name Juice
 Ivan Ivanović (born 1988), Serbian footballer who used to play for FK Zemun and FK Voždovac
 Ivan Ivanović (born 1989), Montenegrin footballer